The Jacobin Club of Mysore was the first Revolutionary Republican organization to be formed in India. It was founded in 1794 by French Republican officers with the support of Tipu Sultan, named after the Jacobin Club in France. He planted a Liberty Tree and declared himself Citizen Tipoo.

History
When the Jacobin Club of Mysore sent a delegation to Tipu Sultan, 500 Mysore rockets were launched as part of the gun salute.

Francis Ripauld was elected President-Citizen, and the Jacobins declared their hatred for all kings except Citizen Tipu and loyalty to the Republic.

The British regarded the link-up of Revolutionary Jacobin forces and Indian resistance as an extremely dangerous development. In the subsequent Fourth Anglo-Mysore war in 1799 against Tipu, the British forced the surrender of French military personnel in Hyderabad, citing their "most virulent principles of Jacobinism."

In a 2005 paper, historian Jean Boutier argued that the club's existence was fabricated by the East India Company to justify British military intervention against Tipu.

See also 
 Jacobin Club

References

Groups of the French Revolution
Jacobins
Political parties in India
Indian independence movement
Political parties established in 1794
1794 establishments in India